The Heber Springs Commercial Historic District encompasses the early commercial heart of Heber Springs, Arkansas.  The district extends along Main Street, between Broadway and 6th Street, including several buildings along some of the cross streets.  The area was developed beginning in 1881, and grew in the late 19th and early 20th centuries, featuring a diversity of commercial architecture from that period.  Prominent buildings include the Cleburne County Courthouse (1914) and the Morton Building at 101 South 3rd Street, the city's oldest surviving commercial building (1895).

The district was listed on the National Register of Historic Places in 2009.  It includes several individually listed properties, including the courthouse, the T.E. Olmstead & Son Funeral Home, and the Woman's Community Club Band Shell in Spring Park.

See also
National Register of Historic Places listings in Cleburne County, Arkansas

References

Historic districts on the National Register of Historic Places in Arkansas
Neoclassical architecture in Arkansas
Buildings and structures in Cleburne County, Arkansas